Ypsolopha exsularis is a moth of the family Ypsolophidae. It is known from South Africa.

References

Endemic moths of South Africa
Ypsolophidae
Moths of Africa